The Twenty-first Texas Legislature met from January 8 to April 6, 1889, in regular session. All members of the House of Representatives and a portion of the members of the Senate were elected in the 1888 General Election.

Sessions
 20th Regular session: January 8, 1889 – April 6, 1889

Party summary

House of Representatives

Officers

Senate
 Lieutenant Governor: Thomas Benton Wheeler, Democrat
 President pro tempore:
 Henry D. McDonald, Democrat, Regular session
 William H. Burges, Democrat, ad interim

House of Representatives
 Speaker of the House: Frank P. Alexander, Democrat

Members

Senate
Members of the Texas Senate for the Twenty-first Texas Legislature:

 Leonard Anderson Abercrombie, Democrat
 William Allen, Unaffiliated
 William T. Armistead, Democrat
 Edwin Augustus Atlee, Democrat
 William H. Burges, Democrat
 Robert H. Burney, Democrat
 John Marshall Claiborne, Democrat
 John Walter Cranford, Democrat
 William Wallace Davis, Democrat
 Elbridge Geary Douglass, Democrat
 Scott Field, Democrat
 Louis Napoleon Frank, Democrat
 George Washington Glasscock, Jr., Unaffiliated
 John H. Harrison, Democrat
 James Melville Ingram, Democrat
 James J. Jarvis, Democrat
 William C. "Cone" Johnson, Democrat
 R.S. Kimbrough, Democrat
 Jonathan Lane, Democrat
 Ernst Gustav Maetze, Democrat
 Henry D. McDonald, Democrat
 Robert Morris, Democrat
 William Henry Pope, Democrat
 Kennan Benjamin Seale, Democrat
 Henry Taylor Sims, Democrat
 John Hall Stephens, Democrat
 M.H. Townsend, Democrat
 George W. Tyler, Democrat
 Samuel Crockett Upshaw, Democrat
 William H. Woodward, Democrat

House of Representatives
Members of the House of Representatives for the Twentieth Texas Legislature:

 These are multimember or flotorial districts.

Membership Changes

Unknown

External links

21st Texas Legislature
1889 in Texas
1889 U.S. legislative sessions